Polyvalent Hall of Bucharest is a multi-purpose indoor arena on the Tineretului Park in Bucharest, Romania. It is home to the CSM București of the National Handball League (LNHF). With a seating capacity of 5,300, the Sala Polivalentă also regularly hosts concerts, conventions and shows.

Concerts
 
Anastacia
Armin van Buuren
Deep Purple
Gorillaz
Iron Maiden (The X Factour, October 17, 1995)
James Blunt
Jean-Michel Jarre
Juanes
Paul van Dyk
RBD
Scorpions 
Sepultura
Simple Minds 
Steve Vai 
Tiësto  
Yes
ZZ Top

Other events
Junior Eurovision Song Contest 2006
Dota 2
The Bucharest Major (US$1,000,000 prize) – September 9–11, 2018
DreamHack
2013 DreamHack Bucharest – September 14–15, 2013
2014 DreamHack Masters Bucharest – April 26–27, 2014
2015 DreamHack Bucharest – April 24–26, 2015
2016 DreamHack Bucharest – September 16–18, 2016
Exhibition basketball
Harlem Globetrotters  – 2007, 2008, 2010, 2017 and 2019
Boxing
2014 Women's European Amateur Boxing Championships – May 31–June 7, 2014
Exhibition figure skating
Kings On Ice featuring Edvin Marton, Evgeni Plushenko and Surya Bonaly– 2008
Handball
2000 European Women's  Championship Final – December 17, 2000
2005–06 EHF Challenge Cup Final – 2006
Olympic Qualifying Tournament 2 – 2008
2009–10 EHF Women's Champions League Final – May 15, 2010
2009–10 EHF Cup Winners' Cup Semifinal – 2010
2011 World Championship – European Qualifying Play-off – June 13, 2010
2012–13 EHF Champions League Semifinal – April 6, 2013
Bucharest Trophy – 2014 and 2015
Carpathian Trophy – 2018
Judo
2004 European Judo Championships – May 14–16, 2004
2018 Club World Championship - Champions League – December 7, 2018
Kickboxing
K-1 Fighting Network Romania 2007 – May 4, 2007
WAKO European Championships 2012 – November 27–December 1, 2012
SUPERKOMBAT World Grand Prix 2012 Final – December 22, 2012
Professional boxing
WBA Lightweight Championship (Leonard Dorin Doroftei vs. Raul Horacio Balbi) – April 19, 2008
WBC Light heavyweight Championship (Adrian Diaconu vs. Chris Henry) – May 31, 2002
Professional wrestling
AWR European Invasion Tour featuring Rob Van Dam, X-Pac, Raven, René Duprée and Scotty 2 Hotty  – 2009
WWE WrestleMania Revenge Tour featuring John Cena, Randy Orton, Sheamus, Daniel Bryan, CM Punk, The Miz, John Morrison, Dolph Ziggler, William Regal, Primo, Santino Marella, Vladimir Kozlov, Sin Cara, The Usos, Mark Henry, Ted DiBiase Jr., Eve Torres, Maryse, Natalya and Alicia Fox – 2011
Sambo
2018 World Sambo Championships – November 9–12, 2018
Tennis
2004 Davis Cup World Group – February 6–8, 2004
Tennis
2017 Fed Cup World Group II – February 11–12, 2017
Weightlifting
2009 European Weightlifting Championships – April 3–12, 2009
Wrestling
2019 European Wrestling Championships – April 8–14, 2019
Volleyball
2017–18 CEV Women's Champions League Final 4 – May 5–6, 2018

See also
List of indoor arenas in Romania
List of indoor arenas by capacity

References

External links 
 

Buildings and structures in Bucharest
Indoor arenas in Romania
Music venues in Romania
Sports venues in Bucharest 
Basketball venues in Romania
Boxing venues in Romania  
Handball venues in Romania
Tennis venues in Romania
Volleyball venues in Romania
Sports venues completed in 1974